Arikawa (written 有川) is a Japanese surname. Notable people with the surname include:

, Japanese writer
, Japanese actor and voice actor
, Japanese ice dancer
, Japanese aikidoka
, Japanese politician

Japanese-language surnames